Chemal (Chemal; , Çamal) is a rural locality (a selo) and the administrative center of Chemalsky District of the Altai Republic, Russia. Population:

Climate
Chemal has a warm-summer humid continental climate (Köppen climate classification Dwb) with mild summers and very cold winters.

References

Notes

Sources

Rural localities in Chemalsky District